Oldenburgia is a genus of flowering plant in the family Asteraceae. It contains four accepted species, including the commonly cultivated, near-endangered species Oldenburgia grandis (Thunb.) Baill. (=Oldenburgia arbuscula DC.); the petricolous Oldenburgia paradoxa Less. (type-species); Oldenburgia intermedia Bond (small distribution around Cape Town); and Oldenburgia papionum DC. Oldenburgia herbacea (L.) Roxb., an unresolved name.

Distribution:  endemic to South Africa, southern parts of Western and Eastern Cape.

References

External links
PlantZAfrica

 
Asteraceae genera
Taxonomy articles created by Polbot